Siau may refer to:
 Siau Island
 Api Siau
 Siau scops owl (Otus manadensis siaoensis)
 Siau languages